The  was a Japanese law passed by the National Diet in 1939 and enacted in 1940. The law gave the state authority control over religious organizations. Following Japan's defeat in World War II, the Religious Organizations Law was repealed on December 28, 1945, and replaced by the "Religious Corporations Ordinance".

See also
Peace Preservation Law
Secular Shrine Theory
Institute of Divinities
Bureau of Religions

References

Legal history of Japan
1939 in Japan
1939 in law
1939 in religion